Niguza eucesta is a species of moth of the family Erebidae first described by Turner in 1903. It is found in Australia in New South Wales, Queensland and the Northern Territory.

The wingspan is about 30 mm.

References

External links
 Moth (Noctuidae) - Niguza eucesta in Central Australia

Catocalini
Moths of Australia